António Valente da Gama Bráz (born 8 December 1962) is a Portuguese equestrian. He competed in two events at the 1992 Summer Olympics.

References

External links
 

1962 births
Living people
Portuguese male equestrians
Olympic equestrians of Portugal
Equestrians at the 1992 Summer Olympics
People from Elvas
Sportspeople from Portalegre District